Combarros-Calleja-Leno syndrome is a very rare genetic disorder which is characterized by a combination of ataxia indistinguishable from Friedreich's ataxia and congenital glaucoma. Additional findings include pes cavus and generalized areflexia. It has been described in 7 members from a consanguineous Spanish family.

See also 

 Congenital glaucoma
 Friedreich's ataxia

References 

Rare diseases
Autosomal recessive disorders
Glaucoma